Philip George may refer to:
 Philip George (cricketer)
 Philip George (DJ)
Phillip George, director of shows such as Forbidden Broadway Cleans Up Its Act